Ethiopia competed at the 2015 World Championships in Athletics in Beijing, China, from 22 to 30 August 2015.

Medalists 
The following competitors from Ethiopia won medals at the Championships

Results
(q – qualified, NM – no mark, SB – season best)

Men 
Track and road events

Women 
Track and road events

References

Nations at the 2015 World Championships in Athletics
World Championships in Athletics
Ethiopia at the World Championships in Athletics